Ariffin is a Malaysian name.

Notable people with this name include:
 Ariffin Mohammed, Malaysian cult leader
 Ariffin Omar, Malaysian politician
 Ariffin Ramly, Malaysian bowler
 Azim Azami Ariffin, Malaysian bowler
 Azizan Ariffin, Malaysian military officer
 Kamarul Ariffin bin Mohamad Yassin, Malaysian scout
 Nora Ariffin, Singaporean model
 Wan Aishah Wan Ariffin, Malaysian politician
Muhammad Syamsul Ariffin bin Brahim (born 30 May 1983), Singaporean gang member of Salakau and fugitive on the run for murder since 31 May 2001.